West Bend Municipal Airport  is a city-owned public-use airport located three nautical miles (6 km) east of the central business district of West Bend, a city in Washington County, Wisconsin, United States. It is included in the Federal Aviation Administration (FAA) National Plan of Integrated Airport Systems for 2023–2027, in which it is categorized as a regional reliever airport facility.

Facilities and aircraft 
West Bend Municipal Airport covers an area of 430 acres (174 ha) at an elevation of 887 feet (270 m) above mean sea level. It has two runways and one helipad:

 Runway 13/31: 4,494 x 75 ft. (1,370 x 23 m), surface: asphalt. This runway has a left traffic pattern. It is equipped with a 4-box VASI on the left side of both runways. Both ends have runway end identifier lights, and have runway lights controllable via the CTAF. Runway 31 has a localizer with a frequency of 108.9.
 Runway 6/24: 3,897 x 75 ft. (1,188 x 23 m), surface: asphalt. This runway has a left traffic pattern. It does not have any visual slope indicators, nor does it have runway end identifier lights.
 Helipad H1: 100 x 100 ft. (30 x 30 m), surface: asphalt. This helipad has left traffic. There are blue perimeter lights.

For the 12-month period ending August 10, 2022, the airport had 46,000 aircraft operations, an average of 126 per day: 65% general aviation, 22% military and 13% air taxi. In January 2023, there were 84 aircraft based at this airport: 65 single-engine, 5 multi-engine, 1 jet, 4 helicopter and 9 military.

West Bend Air operates the FBO (fixed-base operator) and provides 100 octane low lead fuel as well as Jet-A fuel. Rental aircraft, a pilot's lounge, a weather office and a gift shop are also located on field and operated by West Bend Air.

Pilot information

Navigation 
The West Bend Airport can be found on the Chicago sectional chart on the north side. The airport has a very high frequency omnidirectional range beacon (VOR) on field. The West Bend VOR (BJB -... .--- -...) has a frequency of 109.8 MHz. There are also two non-directional beacons (NDB) to the west: JUNEAU (UNU ..- -. ..-) 344 kHz, and ROCK RIVER (RYV .-. -.-- ...-) 371 kHz.

Communication 
West Bend Municipal Airport has a UNICOM frequency of 122.8 MHz, manned by West Bend Air Inc. This frequency is also the common traffic advisory frequency (CTAF). An AWOS is available on 120.0 MHz, which provides wind, visibility, sky conditions, and the altimeter. The weather for this airport can also be found in the form of a METAR on various online aviation weather sites. The controlling agency is Chicago center, but services are also available from Milwaukee approach or Milwaukee departure on 125.35 MHz. IFR flights can also contact clearance delivery on 124.75 MHz.

Airspace 
Immediately overlying the airport is Class G airspace. A ring approx. 14 miles in diameter, centered on the field, of Class E airspace begins at 700 feet above ground level (AGL) and meets Class A airspace at, but not including, 18,000 feet MSL. The outer ring of Milwaukee's Class C airspace begins approx. 17 miles south-southeast of the field, with Waukesha County Airport and Lawrence J. Timmerman Airport's Class D airspace beginning 18 miles south-southwest and 14 miles south (respectively) of the field.

The nearest special use airspace is Restricted Airspace R-6903, which is superimposed over the Minnow MOA (Military Operations Area), approximately 20 miles east and northeast of the field, over Lake Michigan.

See also 
 List of airports in Wisconsin

References

External links 
  at Wisconsin DOT Airport Directory
 West Bend Air, the fixed-base operator (FBO)
 

Airports in Wisconsin
Buildings and structures in Washington County, Wisconsin